Signe Hansen Baattrup  (born 5 March 2000) is a Danish footballer who plays as a midfielder for Fortuna Hjørring in the Elitedivisionen and has appeared for the Denmark women's national under-19 football team.

Career
She has also played for the Danish national under-16 team. She received silver at the Danish Women's Cup in 2018, after getting defeated by Brøndby IF. Her transfer to Fortuna Hjørring was confirmed in January 2022.

Honours

Club
KoldingQ
 Danish Cup
 Runners-up: 2018

References

External links
Profile at Danish Football Association 
 
 
 

2000 births
Living people
Danish women's footballers
Denmark women's youth international footballers
Women's association football defenders
People from Silkeborg
Sportspeople from the Central Denmark Region